The Charles C. and Katharyn Sniteman House is located in Neillsville, Wisconsin.

History
Charles C. Sniteman was a long-time pharmacist and philanthropist. The house was added to the State Register of Historic Places in 2010 and to the National Register of Historic Places the following year.

References

Houses on the National Register of Historic Places in Wisconsin
National Register of Historic Places in Clark County, Wisconsin
Houses in Clark County, Wisconsin
Prairie School architecture in Wisconsin
Houses completed in 1915